Lygistopteroides longipennis is a species of beetle in the family Cerambycidae, the only species in the genus Lygistopteroides.

References

Lepturinae